New York City's 20th City Council district is one of 51 districts in the New York City Council. It has been represented by Democrat Sandra Ung since 2022. She succeeded Republican-turned-Democrat Peter Koo, who was term-limited in 2021.

Geography
District 20 is based in the Queens neighborhood of Flushing, covering its downtown areas as well as its Murray Hill and Queensboro Hill subsections. Kissena Park is located within the district.

The district overlaps with Queens Community Boards 7 and 11, and is contained entirely within New York's 6th congressional district. It also overlaps with the 11th and 16th districts of the New York State Senate, and with the 25th, 26th, and 40th districts of the New York State Assembly.

With its population base in Flushing, which has a large number of Korean and Chinese American residents, the 20th district is the most Asian district in the City Council and the only district with an Asian majority. Former 20th district councilmember John Liu was the first Asian American elected to the City Council. Until 2021, Liu's successor, Peter Koo, was one of only two Asian Americans in the body (alongside former Manhattan councilmember Margaret Chin). This number has increased to five.

Recent election results

2021
In 2019, voters in New York City approved Ballot Question 1, which implemented ranked-choice voting in all local elections. Under the new system, voters have the option to rank up to five candidates for every local office. Voters whose first-choice candidates fare poorly will have their votes redistributed to other candidates in their ranking until one candidate surpasses the 50 percent threshold. If one candidate surpasses 50 percent in first-choice votes, then ranked-choice tabulations will not occur.

2017

2013

References

New York City Council districts